The B-52's is the debut album by the Athens, Georgia-based new wave band the B-52's.  The kitschy lyrics and mood, and the hook-laden harmonies helped establish a fanbase for the band, who went on to release several chart-topping singles. The album cover was designed by Tony Wright (credited as Sue Ab Surd).

The B-52's peaked at number 59 on the Billboard 200, and "Rock Lobster" reached number 56 on the Billboard Hot 100. In 2003, the television network VH1 named The B-52's the 99th greatest album of all time. Shortly before his death, John Lennon said he enjoyed the album. In his 1995 book, The Alternative Music Almanac, Alan Cross placed the album ninth on the list of 10 Classic Alternative Albums. In 2020, The B-52's was ranked number 198 on Rolling Stone magazine's list of the 500 greatest albums of all time.

Critical reception

Critical reception for The B-52's was generally favorable; critics praised the album's kitschy lyrics and party atmosphere. In his "Consumer Guide" column for The Village Voice, music critic Robert Christgau remarked on his fondness "for the pop junk they recycle—with love and panache," while also noting that he was "more delighted with their rhythms, which show off their Georgia roots by adapting the innovations of early funk (a decade late, just like the Stones and Chicago blues) to an endlessly danceable forcebeat format."

In a retrospective review, Stephen Thomas Erlewine of AllMusic wrote: "Unabashed kitsch mavens at a time when their peers were either vulgar or stylish, the Athens quintet celebrated all the silliest aspects of pre-Beatles pop culture – bad hairdos, sci-fi nightmares, dance crazes, pastels, and anything else that sprung into their minds – to a skewed fusion of pop, surf, avant-garde, amateurish punk, and white funk." Rolling Stone writer Pat Blashill concluded that "On The B-52's, the best little dance band from Athens proved that rock & roll still matters if it's about sex and hair and moving your body. Even if you have to shake-bake shake-bake it like a Shy Tuna." Slant Magazines Sal Cinquemani stated that "(l)ike any over-the-top act, the B-52's wears thin, but the band successfully positioned themselves as pop-culture icons—not unlike the musical antiquities they emulated." The B-52's was included in the book 1001 Albums You Must Hear Before You Die. In 2003, Rolling Stone ranked The B-52's number 152 on its list of the 500 greatest albums of all time, maintaining the ranking in a 2012 update of the list and dropping it to number 198 in a 2020 update.

Track listing

Personnel
The B-52's
Kate Pierson – vocals, organ, keyboard bass, additional guitar (tracks 2, 7)
Fred Schneider – vocals, walkie-talkie, toy piano (track 3), keyboard bass (track 7)
Keith Strickland – drums, percussion, Claire sounds
Cindy Wilson – vocals, bongos, tambourine, additional guitar (track 6)
Ricky Wilson – guitars, smoke alarm

Technical
Robert Ash – associate production, engineering
George DuBose – photography
Cass Rigby – assistant engineering
Sue Ab Surd – art direction
La Verne – hairdos

Charts

Weekly charts

Year-end charts

Certifications

References

External links
Track-by-track analysis by The New York Times

 The B-52's at Myspace (streamed copy where licensed)
The B-52's (Adobe Flash) at Radio3Net (streamed copy where licensed)

The B-52's albums
1979 debut albums
Albums produced by Chris Blackwell
Warner Records albums